Vinylcyclopropane [5+2] cycloaddition is a type of cycloaddition between a vinylcyclopropane (VCP) and an olefin or alkyne to form a seven-membered ring.   

Examples of thermal VCP [5+2] cycloaddition are relatively rare, but still feasible in certain cases. However, vinylcyclopropanes readily undergo formal [5+2] processes catalyzed by transition metal complexes. Since the initial report of a rhodium-catalyzed VCP [5+2] cycloaddition from Paul A. Wender's research group, other reaction protocols have been developed with transition metal complexes of rhodium, ruthenium, iron, nickel, iridium and other metals.

Mechanism

Thermal reactions 
Vinylcyclopropanes can undergo formal [5+2] cycloadditions with highly activated dienophiles such as tetracyanoethylene (TCNE). The proposed reaction mechanism involves an initial [2+2] cycloaddition between the vinylcyclopropane and TCNE, followed by rearrangement to furnish the seven-membered ring in the product. Evidences have shown that depending on the reaction conditions, the rearrangement step can occur via either radical or ionic intermediates.

Facile [5+2] cycloaddition is also observed when the vinylcyclopropane moiety is part of a strained heterobicyclic system. A zwitterionic intermediate is proposed for this reaction.

Metal-Catalyzed reactions

Rhodium-catalyzed reactions 

In his initial disclosure, Paul Wender proposed a cyclometalation mechanism for Rh-catalyzed VCP [5+2] cycloaddition, which is similar to Trost's mechanistic proposal for Ru-catalyzed reactions (see next section). However, DFT calculation studies by Kendall Houk and co-workers suggested a different mode of action in intermolecular cases. The Rh-VCP complex first undergoes a C-C bond activation event to form a rhodium π-allyl complex, a process that can be best visualized as the conceptual equivalent of cyclometalation with a diene. Subsequent alkyne coordination followed by 1,2-migratory insertion and reductive elimination affords the heptadiene product.

Ruthenium-catalyzed reactions 
Barry M. Trost and co-workers proposed a mechanism for Ru-catalyzed VCP [5+2] cycloaddition that is slightly different from its rhodium counterpart. Cyclometalation of the ruthenium complex with the enyne takes place first to form a ruthenacyclopentene intermediate with a pendant cyclopropane ring. Subsequent C-C bond activation, which can be viewed as conceptually analogous to tautomerization of metal π-allyl complexes, and reductive elimination afford the final product.

Reaction scope 

Intramolecular [5+2] cycloaddition of VCP with a tethered alkyne, alkene, or allene have been reported.

Examples of intermolecular VCP cycloaddition with alkynes were also reported. However, a heteroatom substituent (e.g. a siloxy group) or a sterically bulky group on the vinylcyclopropane is usually required.

Other variants

Asymmetric [5+2] cycloaddition 

An enantioselective version of the reaction was reported by Wender et al in 2005, featuring a Rh-BINAP catalyst that induces up to >99% enantiomeric excess.

Bridged [5+2] cycloaddition 

Yu and co-workers reported a unique variant of the reaction that preferentially forms bridged bicyclic compounds.

Tandem allylic alkylation/[5+2] cycloaddition 

Martin and co-workers developed an allylic alkylation/[5+2] cycloaddition sequence that forms the enyne precursor in situ with Tsuji-Trost allylic substitution chemistry.

Applications in total syntheses 
Metal-catalyzed VCP [5+2] cycloaddition has found applications in the total syntheses of a variety of molecules such as (+)-dictamnol, (+)-aphanamol I, (+)-allocyathin B2 (–)-pseudolaric acid B, and (+)-frondosin A.

See also 

 Cycloaddition
Cyclopropane
 Vinylcyclopropane rearrangement

References 

Cycloadditions